The subfamily Reynesocoeloceratinae comprises early Jurassic ammonite genera that lived during Pliensbachian stage. These dactylioceratids existed from Ibex ammonite zone and died out in Spinatum zone. They have evolved from Metaderoceras and gave rise to subfamily Dactylioceratinae.

Description
Ammonites with depressed, cadicone, or even evolute, serpenticone shells. Tubercules might be present. Ribs can be both single, or bifurcating. Some members of this subfamily show size dimorphism. They differs from Dactylioceratinae by suture. While Reynesocoeloceratinae has on dorsal side of external lobe two major secondary lobes, this is not so in Dactylioceratinae, as there is external saddle not divided, while lateral lobe is strongly trifid.

Taxonomy 

Reynesocoeloceratinae Dommergues, 1986
Reynesocoeloceras Géczy, 1976
Bettoniceras Wiedenmayer, 1977
Prodactylioceras Spath, 1923
Cetonoceras Wiedenmayer, 1977

References

Dactylioceratidae
Pliensbachian life
Pliensbachian first appearances
Pliensbachian extinctions